Actinoptera filaginis is a species of tephritid or fruit flies in the genus Actinoptera of the family Tephritidae.

Distribution
France, Germany, Italy, Sweden, East Europe.

References

Tephritinae
Insects described in 1862
Diptera of Europe